Spånga-Tensta is a borough (stadsdelsområde) located in Västerort in the western part of Stockholm, Sweden. The districts that make up the borough are Bromsten, Flysta, Lunda, Solhem, Sundby and Tensta. A large portion of Järvafältet is also located in Spånga-Tensta as well as in the districts of Akalla  and Husby in  neighboring Rinkeby-Kista borough.

The borough includes of the  community of Spånga.  The population  is 34,448 on an area of 12.85 km2, which gives a density of 2,680.78/km2.

Transport
The transport provided is:

Rail: The Blue Line of the Stockholm Metro, running from Kungsträdgården in the city centre to Hjulsta station in the north west. It has two stations in the borough of Spånga-Tensta, Hjulsta and Tensta, both inaugurated in 1975. Commuter rail has one station, Spånga Station.
Bus: Several bus routes serve the borough.
Car: E18/Hjulstavägen runs on the north of Hjulsta and Tensta. When finished, the Förbifart Stockholm motorway will connect to E18 at Hjulsta.

References

External links

Boroughs of Stockholm
Västerort